Marbury, Miller & Evans was a Baltimore-based law firm.

Origins

Milestones:
 1854: Charles Marshall law offices
 1867: Marshall & Fisher
 1887: Marshall & Hall; Robertson & Marbury
 1890: Marbury & Bowdoin
 1893: Marshall, Marbury & Bowdoin; Williams & Bond
 1903: Marbury & Gosnell
 1911: Marbury, Gosnell & Williams
 1946: Marbury, Miller & Evans
 1952: Piper & Marbury

Notable achievements

Pipe & Marbury, from 1854 through 1980, had 76 partners. Law school graduating partners included:  30 from the University of Maryland Law School, 14 from Harvard, 9 from the University of Virginia, 3 from the University of Notre Dame, 2 from Georgetown University, 2 from New York University, and 2 from Yale University, with 1 each from the University of Chicago, Columbia University, Duke University, the University of Michigan, University of Pennsylvania, Rutgers University, Washington & Lee University and Western Reserve University.

Among them, they also served:
 Government:: Partners also served as judges or in judicial function, including city solicitors and U.S. Attorney General or Maryland Attorney General as well as other federal or Maryland State departments as well as Governor of Maryland.
 Community:  Members served on boards or staff of:  Baltimore Museum of Art, Catholic University, Oxford University, U.S. Foreign Service, National Gallery of Art, University of Maryland, Harvard Corporation, Peabody Institute, Episcopal Diocese of Maryland, and Maryland Institute of Art.

Notable attorneys, advisors and staff

 Charles Marshall:  Great-nephew of Chief Justice John Marshall, founded firm in 1854 and worked through 1902 (48 years), interrupted by five years in the Confederate Army as a native Virginian and served as colonel and chief of staff of the Army of Northern Virginia; prepared most of General Robert E. Lee's orders, including Lee's farewell address; accompanied Lee to Appomattox surrender; commended terms by U.S. General Ulysses Grant to writing Marshall.
 William A. Fisher: Joined Marshall to form Marshall & Fisher; left 1882 to join Supreme Bench of Baltimore.
 William L. Marbury, Sr.: Eugenicist who helped draft a plan to disenfranchise African-Americans; argued before the U.S. Supreme Court that states had separate rights to discriminate if they chose (1915).

 William L. Marbury, Jr.:  Served as assistant attorney general for the State of Maryland; helped negotiate  GATT (1948); defended childhood friend (and alleged Soviet spy) Alger Hiss in Baltimore-based libel suit (1948) and subsequent trials (1949).

Locations

In 1889, Marshall, Marbury & Bowdoin were located in the Glenn Building at 12 St. Paul Street, Baltimore. In 1897, Marbury & Bowdoin moved to the Equitable Building (Baltimore) at Calvert and Fayette Streets. In 1903, Marbury & Gosnell moved to the Maryland Trust Building, where it remained through 1952, when the firm merged to form Piper & Marbury.

Miscellaneous

In 1896, when Marshall, Marbury & Bowdoin were located in the Glenn Building at 12 St. Paul Street, Baltimore, they advertised their "telephone connection."

See also

 DLA Piper
 Charles Marshall (colonel)
 William L. Marbury, Jr.

References

Privately held companies of the United States
1854 establishments in Maryland
Law firms established in 1854
Law firms established in 1867
Law firms established in 1887
Law firms established in 1890
Law firms established in 1893
Law firms established in 1897
Law firms established in 1903
Law firms established in 1911
Law firms established in 1946
Law firms established in 1952